The 2009–10 season was the 104th season in the existence of AJ Auxerre and the club's 30th consecutive season in the top-flight of French football. In addition to the domestic league, Auxerre participated in this season's editions of the Coupe de France and Coupe de la Ligue.

Players

First-team squad

Transfers

In

Out

Pre-season and friendlies

Competitions

Overall record

Ligue 1

League table

Results summary

Results by round

Matches
The league fixtures were announced on 5 June 2009.

Coupe de France

Coupe de la Ligue

Notes

References

AJ Auxerre seasons
Auxerre